The Dean of Montreal is an Anglican dean in the Anglican Diocese of Montreal of the Ecclesiastical Province of Canada, based at Christ Church Anglican Cathedral in Montreal.

The incumbents have been (incomplete list):

References

Deans of Montreal
Deans of Montreal